Beautiful Seizure is the debut album by volcano!.

Track listing 
 "Kalamazoo" - 1:12
 "Easy Does It" - 6:47
 "Fire Fire" - 5:25
 "$40,000 Plus Interest" - 6:48
 "Larchmontt's Arrival" - 1:14
 "La Lluvia" - 2:43
 "Red and White Bells" - 9:33
 "Apple or a Gun" - 5:03
 "Frozen in Escape" - 4:53
 "Before the Suburbs" - 1:16
 "Hello Explosion" - 4:10
 "Pulling My Face in and out of Distortion, I Blink Too Much" - 6:53

Personnel 
 Mark Cartwright - laptop, synths, bass, melodica, tuba
 Sam Scranton - drums, percussion
 Aaron With - guitar, vocals

References 

2005 albums